Laura Bieliková (born 22 January 2000) is a Slovak footballer who plays as a midfielder for the Slovakia women's national team.

References

2000 births
Living people
Slovak women's footballers
Women's association football midfielders
Slovakia women's international footballers